Pavel Florián (born 27 April 1987) is a Czech badminton player. He won the men's doubles title at the 2015 Uganda International, and also finished runners-up in the 2006 Lithuanian International in the men's doubles and 2008 Slovenian International in the men's singles.

Achievements

BWF International Challenge/Series 
Men's singles

Men's doubles

  BWF International Challenge tournament
  BWF International Series tournament
  BWF Future Series tournament

References

External links 
 

1987 births
Living people
People from Český Krumlov
Sportspeople from the South Bohemian Region
Czech male badminton players
Badminton players at the 2015 European Games
European Games competitors for the Czech Republic